Susan Pedersen is a Canadian historian, and James P. Shenton Professor of the Core Curriculum at Columbia University. Pedersen focuses on 19th and 20th century British history, women's history, settler colonialism, and the history of international institutions.

Life
Born a Canadian citizen and raised in Japan, she received her B.A. (1982) from Radcliffe College and both her M.A. (1983) and Ph.D (1989) from Harvard University, where she was also a professor and served as the university's Dean of Undergraduate Education. In the latter position, she defended the university against charges of excessive grade inflation.

Pedersen joined the Columbia faculty in 2003. Among her works is a biography of Eleanor Rathbone.
She also recently completed a book on the mandate system of the League of Nations; in 2005 she was awarded a Guggenheim Fellowship to assist with research on this project.

Susan Pedersen was Bosch Fellow in Public Policy at the American Academy in Berlin, for Spring 2009. She was elected a fellow of the British Academy in 2020.

Works
The Guardians: The League of Nations and the Crisis of Empire (Oxford University Press, 2015), winner of the 2015 Cundill Prize in Historical Literature.
Caroline Elkins, Susan Pedersen (eds) Settler Colonialism in the Twentieth Century, Routledge, 2005, 

"National Bodies, Unspeakable Acts: The Sexual Politics of Colonial Policy-making," The Journal of Modern History Vol. 63, No. 4, December 1991
"Gender, Welfare, and Citizenship in Britain during the Great War," The American Historical Review Vol. 95, No. 4, October 1990
"Hannah More Meets Simple Simon: Tracts, Chapbooks, and Popular Culture in Late Eighteenth-Century England," Journal of British Studies 25 (January 1986): 84-113.

References

External links
NPR interview with Susan Pedersen on grade inflation at Harvard

1959 births
Living people
Harvard University alumni
Harvard Graduate School of Arts and Sciences alumni
Columbia University faculty
20th-century Canadian historians
Radcliffe College alumni
21st-century Canadian historians
Fellows of the Royal Historical Society
Fellows of the British Academy